Triton Island is the westernmost and southernmost of the Paracel Islands in the South China Sea. The island is administered by the People's Republic of China, and is also claimed by the Republic of China (Taiwan) and Vietnam.

The island was historically known by the Chinese as Bànlù Zhì, and as Luó Dǎo to Chinese fishermen. Other Chinese sources have it named as 南建岛, as it was the southernmost point claimed by China until after 1933. The current Chinese name commemorates the Republic of China Navy warship ROCS Chung-chien sent in 1946 to claim the Paracel Islands.

History

Lacking a native population, ownership of the Paracel Islands has been disputed since the early 20th century. Control has been enforced by the People's Republic of China since the Battle of the Paracel Islands.

In 1973 the cargo ship USNS Sgt. Jack J. Pendleton was abandoned on the reef of Triton Island, having run aground there en route from Vietnam to the Philippines.

The USS Mt Vernon (LSD 39) with other units, including UDT teams, salvaged cargo from the J.J. Pendleton in fall of 1973. The passage through the reef, in the southwest corner of the island, was to allow amphibious craft access to the beach to offload cargo. This operation continued for about one month. The Pendleton had originally run around on Triton Island during a typhoon in October and was further driven ashore in the midst of three additional typhoons in the following weeks.

Freedom of navigation manoeuvres

On January 30, 2016, the United States warship  passed within 12 nautical miles of the island. The Pentagon stated that it had notified none of the three claimants to the island beforehand, and stated the reason for the transit was to protect freedom of navigation, "consistent with international law". The People's Republic of China called the voyage "provocative" and that it "violated relevant Chinese laws by entering Chinese territorial waters without prior permission".

In July 2017, the guided missile destroyer  navigated within 12 miles of Triton island as part of a FONOP (Freedom of navigation operation).

In May 2018, the guided missile destroyer  navigated within 12 miles of Triton island as part of a FONOP (Freedom of navigation operation).

External links 
 Photo 
 Photo 
 Photo (2012)

References

Baselines of the Chinese territorial sea
Paracel Islands